William Henry Barbour Jr. (February 4, 1941 – January 8, 2021) was a United States district judge of the United States District Court for the Southern District of Mississippi.

Early life and education

Barbour was born in Yazoo City, Mississippi. He received a Bachelor of Arts degree from Princeton University in 1963 where he lettered in football and was a member of The University Cottage Club.  He received a Juris Doctor from the University of Mississippi School of Law in 1966 and then attended the Graduate Tax Program at New York University School of Law.

Career 
After graduating from law school, Barbour returned to Mississippi. He established his practice with his family's private law firm in Yazoo City, Mississippi from 1966 to 1983, and was also a youth counselor for the Yazoo County Youth Court from 1971 to 1982.

Federal judicial service

Barbour was nominated by President Ronald Reagan on March 15, 1983, to a seat on the United States District Court for the Southern District of Mississippi vacated by Judge William Harold Cox. He was confirmed by the United States Senate on April 21, 1983, and received his commission on April 25, 1983. He served as Chief Judge from 1989 to 1996, and assumed senior status on February 4, 2006. Barbour indicated that he would take inactive senior status on January 4, 2019, meaning that while he remained a federal judge, he no longer heard cases or participated in the business of the court.

Personal life

Barbour was a cousin and former law partner of Haley Barbour, former Governor of Mississippi.

Death
Barbour died on January 8, 2021, at his home in Yazoo City.

References

Sources
 

1941 births
2021 deaths
New York University School of Law alumni
Princeton University alumni
University of Mississippi alumni
Judges of the United States District Court for the Southern District of Mississippi
United States district court judges appointed by Ronald Reagan
20th-century American judges
21st-century American judges